Pakistani nationality law details the conditions by which a person holds Pakistani nationality. The primary law governing nationality regulations is the Pakistan Citizenship Act, 1951, which came into force on 13 April 1951. With few exceptions, almost all individuals born in the country are automatically citizens at birth. Foreign nationals may naturalise as Pakistani citizens after residing in the country for at least five years and showing proficiency in at least one vernacular language of Pakistan.

Pakistan was previously ruled by the British Empire and local residents were British subjects and British protected persons. Although Pakistan gained independence in 1947 and Pakistanis no longer hold British nationality, they continue to have favoured status when residing in the United Kingdom; as Commonwealth citizens, Pakistanis are eligible to vote in UK elections and serve in public office there.

History

Partition and transition 

British India was partitioned into two independent nations on 15 August 1947, the Union of India and Dominion of Pakistan. Pakistan transitionally retained the British sovereign as its head of state in the post-partition period, using its Dominion status as a deterrent against possible Indian incursion. Pakistanis continued to be British subjects until independent Pakistan enacted its own nationality legislation. Subjects of the princely states were previously considered British protected persons but lost that status when the Indian Independence Act 1947 released those states from British vassalage. The states' subsequent accession to Pakistan meant that former protected persons became British subjects of Pakistan.

British subject status was reformed under the British Nationality Act 1948. The Act abandoned the common nationality used across the Empire and redefined British subject to mean any citizen of a Commonwealth country. A Commonwealth citizen was defined in this Act to have the same meaning. British subject/Commonwealth citizen status co-existed with the citizenship of each Commonwealth country. Because Pakistan had not enacted citizenship regulations by the time the 1948 Act took effect, Pakistanis (and citizens of all other Dominions without citizenship laws) were provisionally classed as "British subjects without citizenship".

Both Pakistan and India law claim to the disputed region of Kashmir, which has been the subject of numerous wars between the two countries. The Pakistani Citizenship Act of 1951 allowed persons who were subjects of the state of Jammu and Kashmir to travel under a Pakistani passport and be considered a citizen of Pakistan without prejudice.

Commonwealth citizenship

Between August 1947 and January 1972, Pakistani citizens were Commonwealth citizens by default.

Between January 1972 and late 1989, Pakistani citizens were not Commonwealth citizens.

Since late 1989, Pakistani citizens are also Commonwealth citizens by default.

Controversial issues

The independence of Bangladesh from Pakistan in 1971 led to the abandonment in the Bengali-majority state of around half a million "stranded Pakistanis", who traced their ethnolinguistic heritage to the Bihar region. In 2008, a Supreme Court ruling granted the Pakistani Biharis full voting and citizenship rights and in 2022 NADRA issued CNIC cards to Pakistani Bengalis as Pakistani citizens, making them legal citizens and granting them full voting and citizen rights. 

Many of the 1.5 million registered Afghan refugees in Pakistan have been unable to acquire Pakistani nationality, including those born in Pakistan. The inability to become naturalized Pakistan citizens has been due to bureaucratic hurdles that have left many without adequate identity documents in which to apply for citizenship.

On 20 September 2012, the Supreme Court of Pakistan disqualified eleven lawmakers including Interior Minister Rehman Malik for failing to disclose their dual nationalities upon taking office.

Acquisition and loss of citizenship

Entitlement by birth or descent 

Any person born in Pakistan since 13 April 1951 automatically receives Pakistani citizenship by birth except if they are the child of a foreign diplomat, enemy alien, or refugee. Children born overseas are automatically Pakistani citizens by descent if either parent is a citizen otherwise than by descent or is employed by the government of Pakistan. Individuals born to parents who are citizens by descent only may alternatively acquire citizenship if their births are registered at a Pakistani diplomatic mission. Children born before 18 April 2000 were entitled to citizenship by descent through their fathers only. However, minor children of Pakistani mothers could apply for registration as citizens in a separate process that was subject to discretionary approval of the government.

Voluntary acquisition 

Foreigners over the age of 18 may become Pakistani citizens by naturalisation after residing in the country for at least four years within a seven-year period, followed by a further one year of residence immediately before application. Applicants must demonstrate proficiency in at least one of the languages of Pakistan, satisfy a good character requirement, intend to reside permanently in the country or begin service in the Pakistani government, and cannot hold citizenship of countries that bar Pakistani citizens from naturalisation. Commonwealth citizens may alternatively acquire citizenship by registration with a financial investment in the country. After transferring 5,000,000 Pakistani rupees to the State Bank, investors receive an immigrant visa. Citizenship is then granted on their arrival in Pakistan. Foreign women married to (and widows formerly married to) Pakistani men are entitled to apply for citizenship, provided that their husbands did not acquire citizenship by naturalisation or registration.

Relinquishment and deprivation 

Pakistani citizenship may be voluntarily relinquished by any person above age 18, provided that the applicant already holds (or has documentary assurance that they will soon acquire) another citizenship. Minor children of a father who gave up citizenship also cease to be citizens, unless they remained living in Pakistan at the time of their father's renunciation. Former citizens who renounced their status may subsequently apply to resume their Pakistani citizenship. There are no specific requirements for citizenship resumption other than making a written declaration to the government.

Naturalised citizens may be involuntarily deprived of the status if they fraudulently acquired it, are sentenced to imprisonment for more than 12 months in any jurisdiction in the world, or they wilfully perform an act that constitutes a breach of loyalty to the state. Any citizen who continuously resides abroad for more than seven years are also subject to deprivation, unless they are employed by the government while overseas or have submitted a declaration of intent to retain citizenship at a Pakistani diplomatic mission.

Although the Pakistan Citizenship Act, 1951 provides for the deprivation of citizenship from any Pakistani who becomes a citizen of another country, the Lahore High Court has ruled that this process is not automatic and does not apply unless acquiring the foreign citizenship is conditional on renouncing Pakistani citizenship. Despite this lack of deprivation, there are a number of explicitly defined circumstances in which dual citizenship is allowed. The government has concluded bilateral agreements specifically allowing holding multiple nationalities with the following countries: Australia, Bahrain, Belgium, Canada, Denmark, Egypt, Finland, France, Germany, Iceland, Ireland, Italy, Jordan, the Netherlands, New Zealand, Norway, Sweden, Switzerland, Syria, the United Kingdom, and the United States. 

Dual citizens are prohibited from contesting in elections for Parliament or local government positions in the province of Punjab.

See also

Pakistani passport
Indian nationality law
British nationality law
Bangladeshi nationality law
Commonwealth citizenship

References

Citations

General sources 

 
 
 
 
 
 
 

 
Pakistan and the Commonwealth of Nations